These are the Canadian number-one country songs of 1980, per the RPM Country Tracks chart. NOTE: Beginning September 13, RPM published biweekly charts through the end of the year.

See also
1980 in music
List of number-one country singles of 1980 (U.S.)

References

External links
 Read about RPM Magazine at the AV Trust
 Search RPM charts here at Library and Archives Canada

 
Country
1980